The Mountain Brook Estates Building is a commercial building in the planned community of Mountain Brook, Alabama. The neo-medieval building was built as the commercial center of the suburban community. Built in 1928, it is a steel structure clad with half-timbering meant to evoke an idealized English town center. Mountain Brook Estates is one of the three most significant examples of a romanticized suburb in the United States, along with Grosse Pointe, Michigan and Country Club Plaza in Kansas City, Missouri.

Description
The Mountain Brook Estates Building is a one and two story steel-framed structure with five ground floor commercial tenant spaces. Offices are on the second floor. It is situated on the town center circle, with one-story arms on side streets. The building is underlain by a full basement. The ground floor is mainly brick, while the upper level is mainly half-timbering and stucco. The roof is tile shingle. The design is a picturesque interpretation of early English town buildings.

The building was placed on the National Register of Historic Places on April 8, 2003.

References

External links
 

Commercial buildings on the National Register of Historic Places in Alabama
Tudor Revival architecture in the United States
Commercial buildings completed in 1928
National Register of Historic Places in Jefferson County, Alabama
Historic American Landscapes Survey in Alabama
Mountain Brook, Alabama
1928 establishments in Alabama